Ayensuano District is one of the thirty-three districts in Eastern Region, Ghana. Originally it was formerly part of the then-larger Suhum-Kraboa-Coaltar District in 1988, which was created from the former Suhum-Kraboa-Coaltar District Council, until the southern part of the district was split off to create Ayensuano (district) on 28 June 2012; thus the remaining part has been renamed as Suhum Municipal District, which it was also elevated into municipal district assembly status on that same year. The district assembly is located in the southern part of Eastern Region and has Coaltar as its capital town.

Political representation
The district has one constituency by the same name, Ayensuano which has forty electoral areas. The district is divided into three zones,  Obesua Zone, Anum Apapam Zone and Kraboa-Coaltar Zone.

References

External Sources
 
 About Ayensuano District Assembly

Districts of the Eastern Region (Ghana)